Doora Saridaru (meaning: Moved apart) is a 1960 Kannada novel by saraswathi samman awarded novelist S.L. Bhyrappa. This is one of the novels written at an early stage of his writings. The novel portrays two sets of young couples in their college campus with their psychological and social conflicts that prevent them getting married.

Characters
Sachindananda, Vinitha , Vasantha, and Uma

References

Kannada novels
1960 novels
1960 Indian novels
Novels by S. L. Bhyrappa